Goffredo is an Italian given name, cognate with Godfrey, Gottfried, Galfrid, etc. Notable people with the name include:

Goffredo Alessandrini (1904–1978), Italian script writer and film director
Goffredo Baur, Italian cross country skier who competed in the 1930s
Goffredo Borgia (born 1481), the youngest son of Pope Alexander VI and Vannozza dei Cattanei, member of the House of Borgia
Goffredo Cappa (1644–1717), Italian luthier, known for his violins and cellos
Goffredo da Castiglione, Pope Celestine IV (died 1241)
Goffredo (died 1194), Patriarch of Aquileia in northern Italy from 1182 to 1194
Goffredo Lagger (born 1901), Italian Olympic biathlete
Goffredo Lombardo (1920–2005), Italian film producer
Goffredo Malaterra, eleventh-century Benedictine monk and historian, possibly of Norman origin
Goffredo Mameli (1827–1849), Italian patriot, poet, and writer was a notable figure in the Italian Risorgimento
Goffredo Parise (1929–1986), Italian writer and journalist
Goffredo Petrassi (1904–2003), Italian composer of modern classical music, conductor, and teacher
Goffredo Ridello (died 1084), the Duke of Gaeta as a vassal of the Prince of Capua from 1067 or 1068
Goffredo Sommavilla (1850–1944), Italian painter, mainly of genre themes
Goffredo Stabellini (born 1925), Italian professional football player
Goffredo da Trani (died 1245), Italian jurist, known as a canon lawyer
Goffredo da Viterbo (1120–1196), Roman Catholic chronicler, either Italian or German
Goffredo Zehender (1901–1958), Italian racing driver

See also
A.C. Castellana Castel Goffredo, Italian association football club located in Castel Goffredo, Lombardy
Castel Goffredo, a comune in the province of Mantua, in Lombardy, Italy
Tortello amaro di Castel Goffredo, a type of stuffed pasta like ravioli and recognized traditional food product of the Lombardy region
Galfrid
Godefroy (disambiguation)
Godfrey (name)
Geoffrey
Gottfried

Italian masculine given names